Flying Man may refer to:

Flying Man an assist character in the Japanese NES game Mother (video game) and in its sequel, EarthBound.
"The Flying Man", an 1893 short story by H. G. Wells
"Flying man" argument, formulated by the Persian polymath and philosopher Avicenna
Flying Man, a character in the Cirque du Soleil production Alegría
"Flying Man", nickname of fictional character Nathan Petrelli on the television show Heroes